Mundo is the eighth studio album by Panamian singer-songwriter Rubén Blades released on September 17, 2002 , through Sony International, Sony Tropical and Columbia Records. It was produced by Blades, Walter Flores and Edin Solís and featuring songs by standards Folk like "Danny Boy" and salsa standards such as "Estampa", "Parao!", "El Captan y la Sirena" among others. At the 45th Annual Grammy Awards, the album won a Grammy Award for Best World Music Album, at and also received at the 4th Annual Latin Grammy Awards nomination for Album of the Year.

Track listing
All songs by Rubén Blades, unless noted otherwise.

 "Estampa (Profile)" – 7:22
 "First Circle" (Mays, Metheny) – 4:50
 "Primogenio (Beginnings)" (Blades, Flores) – 3:51
 "Bochinches (Gossip)" (Blades, Flores) – 4:41
 "Ella (She)" – 5:48
 "Parao! (On My Feet)" – 5:58
 "Como Nosotros (Like You and Me)" – 5:40
 "El Capitain y la Sirena (The Captain and the Mermaid)" – 3:29
 "Sebastian" – 5:06
 "Consideracion (Consideration) (Oriente)" (Blades, Gil) – 3:51
 "Jiri Son Bali" – 4:20
 "Danny Boy" (Weatherly) – 6:54
 "La Ruta (The Road) (Diha Cesto)" – 4:08
 "A San Patricio (Extracto)" – 2:33

References

2002 albums
Rubén Blades albums
Grammy Award for Best World Music Album
Latin Grammy Award for Best Contemporary Tropical Album